Róbert Nagy (born 4 November 1972 in Bratislava) is a Slovak former cyclist.

Major results

1999
 1st Stage 4 Tour of Yugoslavia
2000
 1st  Road race, National Road Championships
2001
 3rd Time trial, National Road Championships
2002
 1st Stage 2 Paths of King Nikola
 2nd Road race, National Road Championships
 3rd Overall Grand Prix Cycliste de Gemenc
1st Stage 2
2003
 1st  Time trial, National Road Championships
2004
 3rd Time trial, National Road Championships
2007
 1st Stage 3 Tour de Hongrie
2008
 2nd Time trial, National Road Championships
 3rd Völkermarkter Radsporttage
2010
 2nd Overall Paths of King Nikola
 3rd Time trial, National Road Championships
2011
 3rd Time trial, National Road Championships
 3rd Central European Tour Miskolc GP

References

External links

1972 births
Living people
Slovak male cyclists
Cyclists at the 1996 Summer Olympics
Cyclists at the 2000 Summer Olympics
Olympic cyclists of Slovakia
Sportspeople from Bratislava